Barauli may refer to:

Places in Bihar, India
 Barauli, Bihar, a town in the Gopalganj district
 Barauli, Bihar (Vidhan Sabha constituency), an assembly constituency in Gopalganj district

Places in Uttar Pradesh, India
 Barauli, Jaunpur, a village in the Jaunpur district
 Barauli, Kanpur Dehat, a village in the Kanpur Dehat district
 Barauli, Ballia, a village in the Ballia district
 Barauli, Uttar Pradesh (Vidhan Sabha constituency), an assembly constituency in Aligarh district
 Barauli Rao, a town, panchayat block and Vidhan Sabha constituency in Aligarh district